Eliseo Álvarez (9 August 1940 – 1999) was an Uruguayan football defender who played for Uruguay in the 1962 and 1966 FIFA World Cups. He also played for Club Nacional de Football and Rampla Juniors. 
In Argentina, he played for Banfield and Platense.

References

External links
 FIFA profile

1940 births
1999 deaths
Uruguayan footballers
Uruguay international footballers
Association football defenders
Uruguayan Primera División players
Ecuadorian Serie A players
Club Nacional de Football players
Rampla Juniors players
L.D.U. Quito footballers
Club Atlético Banfield footballers
1962 FIFA World Cup players
1966 FIFA World Cup players
Uruguayan expatriate footballers
Expatriate footballers in Ecuador